Jenny Emilie Greta "Margareta" Lindberg (31 May 1889 – 6 May 1974) was a Swedish tennis player. She competed in singles at the 1920 Summer Olympics and finished in 15th place.

References

1889 births
1984 deaths
Swedish female tennis players
Olympic tennis players of Sweden
Tennis players at the 1920 Summer Olympics
Tennis players from Stockholm